Agathia magnificentia is a moth of the family Geometridae first described by Hiroshi Inoue in 1978. It is found in Taiwan.

The wingspan is 38–45 mm.

References

Moths described in 1978
Geometrinae
Moths of Taiwan